Figure of Eight is a 1936 novel by the British writer Compton Mackenzie.

Figure of Eight was written within a month, consisting of more than 100,000 words.

References

Bibliography
 David Joseph Dooley. Mackenzie Compton Mackenzie. Twayne Publishers, 1974.
 Andro Linklater. Compton Mackenzie: A Life Hogarth Press, 1992.

1936 British novels
Novels by Compton Mackenzie
Cassell (publisher) books